Highway One is an album by American jazz vibraphonist Bobby Hutcherson recorded in 1978 and released on the Columbia label. The album was Hutcherson's first for Columbia after a long association with Blue Note Records.

Reception
The Allmusic review by Scott Yanow awarded the album 3½ stars stating "With keyboardist George Cables and vibraphonist Bobby Hutcherson contributing all of the compositions, it is not too surprising that this LP has plenty of strong melodies... A fine (if not overly adventurous) outing".

Track listing
All compositions by Bobby Hutcherson except as indicated
 "Secrets of Love" (George Cables) - 8:17 
 "Bouquet" - 6:20 
 "Highway One" - 7:27 
 "Sweet Rita Suite (Part 2 - Her Soul)" (Cables) - 6:09 
 "Circle" (Cables) - 5:00 
 "Secrets of Love (Reprise)" (Todd Barkan, Cables) - 8:32
Recorded at Wally Heider Studios in San Francisco, California between May 30 and June 23, 1978

Personnel
Bobby Hutcherson - vibes, arranger
James Leary - bass
Eddie Marshall - drums
George Cables - piano, electric piano (tracks 1 & 3-6), arranger 
Cedar Walton - piano (track 2), arranger 
Hubert Laws - flute (tracks 1, 5 & 6)
Freddie Hubbard - flugelhorn (track 4)
Kenneth Nash - percussion (tracks 1, 3, 5 & 6)
Jessica Cleaves - vocals (track 6)
Unnamed strings and brass

References 

Columbia Records albums
Bobby Hutcherson albums
1978 albums